Halili may refer to: 
Halili (name)
Fortunato Halili Avenue in Bulacan, Philippines
Fortunato F. Halili National Agricultural School in Bulacan, Philippines
Dave Halili American Artist, painter
Skënder Halili Complex in Albania